Sal from the kindred Atyusz (died between 1227 and 1237) was a Hungarian noble, who served as ispán of Karakó ispánate in 1205.

He was a member of the Atyusz kindred, his cousins were the influential lords Atyusz III, Lawrence (sons of Atyusz II), Miska III and Solomon (sons of Miska II), however Sal's father is unidentified. In 1212, Sal was mentioned as a pristaldus (bailiff) of Andrew II of Hungary.

Sal made his first will and testament in 1221, when bequeathed his estates (e.g. lands and vineyards in Vöröstó, Kál, Tagyon) to the Almád Abbey, a Benedictine monastery founded by his genus, and his daughters. In 1227, he wrote his second testament by inviting his "relative" Stephen, Bishop of Zagreb. He donated further lands in this document. According to a charter issued in 1237, Sal died without male heirs. He had four daughters: Eve (spouse of Buzád III Hahót, the son of Buzád II Hahót), Weniwer, Helbrung and Agnes.

References

Sources

 

1230s deaths
Sal
13th-century Hungarian people